The Leuchtenberg Gallery was the collection of artworks of the Dukes of Leuchtenberg, on public display in Munich. The collection was widely known in 19th-century Europe, due to being open to the public and having a high-quality illustrated catalogue in different languages, and was considered one of the most important private collections of the time.
The collection was a heritage from Napoleonic times through Joséphine de Beauharnais, but with new additions by the subsequent Dukes, especially Eugène de Beauharnais. In 1810, Eugène de Beauharnais bought part of the collection of Giovanni Francesco Arese, including at least one painting by Peter Paul Rubens. By 1841, the collection was largely complete.

The Gallery was located in the Palais Leuchtenberg, the house of the Leuchtenberg family in Munich, built by Leo von Klenze between 1817 and 1821. It was opened to the public from at least 1837 on. The collection was catalogued in French and German from 1825 on, with a new version in German from 1841 on, and in an illustrated catalogue in English in 1852. After the death of Duke Maximilian in 1852, the Gallery was closed, the collection divided between his children, and the Palace sold to Luitpold, Prince Regent of Bavaria. Part of the collection was transferred to Saint Petersburg in 1854, where it was displayed in the Mariinsky Palace, and from 1870 on was lent to the Imperial Academy of Arts. The remainder moved together with Eugen Maximilianovich, Duke of Leuchtenberg, from Munich to Saint Petersburg in 1863. While the collection was still growing in the 1860s with purchases by Grand Duchess Maria Nikolaevna of Russia, by the end of the century, some works were being sold off. The majority of the collection remained together until the Russian Revolution in 1917, when it was dispersed and a number of paintings sold in Sweden. Many works were acquired by the Hermitage and the Pushkin Museum, with others ending up in museums all over the world. For example, Parmigianino's Circumcision of Jesus is now housed at the Detroit Institute of Arts. The remaining works are either lost or in private collections.

Collection
This is the full collection from the 1852 catalogue of the Gallery, listed with the most common modern name for the artists instead of the names used in the catalogue. In addition, some works present in the 1826 or 1841 catalogues but not in the 1852 catalogue have been included. Where known, the most recent attribution and current location of the work have been noted. The first appearance of a work in an older catalogue of the Gallery has also been indicated. This includes the 1826 and expanded 1841 German language catalogues.

Paintings

Sculptures

References

External links

Art museums and galleries in Munich
Defunct art museums and galleries

Art museums disestablished in 1852
1852 disestablishments in Germany
Private collections in Germany
German art collectors
Leuchtenberg
Former private collections